Buhagiar is a surname concentrated mainly in Malta, which may be its originating country too. Notable people with the surname include:

 Antonio Maria Buhagiar (1846–1891), born Spiridion Buhagiar, Catholic bishop
 Francesco Buhagiar (1876–1934), Maltese politician
 Gio Nicola Buhagiar (1698–1752), Maltese painter
 Mario Buhagiar (born 1945), Maltese author  
 Richard Buhagiar (born 1972), Maltese-Australian professional footballer
 Tony Buhagiar (born 1955), Australian rules footballer
 Trent Buhagiar (born 1998), Australian professional footballer
 Valerie Buhagiar (born 1963), Maltese-Canadian actress, film director and television host
 (born 1965) Romanian stage designer